Memory Hill Cemetery is an American cemetery in Milledgeville, Georgia. The cemetery opened in 1804.

Notable interments

Thomas Petters Carnes (1762–1822), United States Representative for Georgia and state court judge.
George Pierce Doles (1830–1864), Georgia businessman and Confederate general during the American Civil War. 
Tomlinson Fort (1787–1859), United States Representative for Georgia
Tomlinson Fort (1839–1910), mayor of Chattanooga, Tennessee
Seaton Grantland (1782–1864), United States Representative for Georgia
Dixie Haygood (1861–1915), illusionist and vaudeville star
Charles Holmes Herty (1867–1938), American academic, scientist, and businessman
Edwin Francis Jemison (1844–1862), Confederate Civil War soldier whose haunting photograph is one of the most reproduced images from this conflict
Augustus Holmes Kenan (1805–1870), member of the Georgia House of Representatives, Georgia Senate, Provisional Confederate Congress, and First Confederate Congress
John Marlor, master builder and originator of the "Milledgeville Federal" style in Milledgeville, Georgia
Ezra Allen "Bill" Miner (1847–1913), noted American criminal
David Brydie Mitchell (1766–1837), Governor of Georgia
Susan Myrick (1893–1978), American author and newspaper columnist, known as "The Emily Post of the South"  
Flannery O'Connor (1925–1964), American author
 James Milton Richardson (1913–1980), fifth bishop of the Episcopal Diocese of Texas
John W. A. Sanford (1798–1870),  United States Representative for Georgia
Carl Vinson (1883–1981), United States Representative for Georgia
John W. Wilcox, Jr. (1882–1942), United States Navy rear admiral (memorial marker only; Wilcox was lost at sea and his body was not recovered)

External links
Memory Hill Cemetery website
Find A Grave listing for Memory Hill Cemetery
Hill, Sean. "The Morning with Many Tongues." Southern Spaces, February 27, 2009

Protected areas of Baldwin County, Georgia
Baldwin County, Georgia
Cemeteries in Georgia (U.S. state)
1804 establishments in Georgia (U.S. state)